The natural range of the carnivorous plant genus Heliamphora is restricted to the southern Venezuelan states of Amazonas and Bolívar, and to adjacent portions of northern Brazil and western Guyana, an area corresponding to the western part of the Guayana Shield. These plants are largely confined to the summits and foothills of the sandstone table-top mountains of the region, known as tepuis.

The genus has a highly disjunct distribution spread across two major groups of tepuis: the western range in Amazonas and the eastern range in Bolívar. The western range can be further subdivided into two complexes of neighbouring tepuis. The more southerly of these consists of Cerro de la Neblina, Cerro Aracamuni, and Cerro Avispa, and supports four Heliamphora species. The more northerly group of the western range, home to only two species, includes the massive Cerro Duida and neighbouring Cerro Huachamacari and Cerro Marahuaca. The remaining 17–19 species are native to the eastern range, which includes the Aprada Massif, Auyán Massif, Chimantá Massif, Eastern Tepuis chain, Los Testigos chain, and a number of outlying tepuis. Many of the summits of the eastern range are situated on a vast plateau known as the Gran Sabana. Only two species (H. ciliata and H. heterodoxa) are known with certainty from the Gran Sabana, and only H. ciliata is endemic to this habitat.

The altitudinal distribution of Heliamphora ranges from 860 m above sea level for populations of H. neblinae on Cerro Avispa to as much as 2994 m for plants of H. hispida growing near the summit of Pico da Neblina in Cerro de la Neblina.

Key
Tepui names shown in the tables are those used in Flora of the Venezuelan Guayana and Sarraceniaceae of South America, with alternate names and spellings given in brackets. Many additional orthographic variants are likely to exist and some localities remain the subject of considerable toponymic confusion; these cases are covered in the Notes section. Many of the tepui heights are approximate and likely to change as more accurate measurements become available. Only tepuis known to support Heliamphora are included in the tables (for example, not all parts of the Chimantá Massif or Eastern Tepuis chain are listed). Formally described species are listed first, followed by undescribed species, and finally natural hybrids. Where published information is available, the altitudinal distribution of a taxon at a particular locality is given. In cases of unconfirmed locality records, the taxon name is preceded by a question mark (?).

Coordinates given correspond to the approximate centre points of tepui summit plateaus (though in the case of fragmented tepui complexes such as Cerro de la Neblina, the centre point itself may not lie on any plateau). Unless otherwise indicated, all other information presented in the tables is sourced from Sarraceniaceae of South America.

Western range
The western range of the genus is confined almost entirely to Amazonas state, Venezuela, but extends slightly into northernmost Brazil.

Neblina Massif
The Neblina Massif is located in the extreme south of Amazonas and is dominated by the highly fragmented complex known as Cerro de la Neblina. This complex has many plateaus averaging 2000–2400 m in elevation, and includes Brazil's two highest peaks: Pico da Neblina (2994 m) and Pico 31 de Março (2973 m), known as Pico Phelps in Venezuela. A giant valley, Cañón Grande, runs southwest to northeast through the middle of Cerro de la Neblina. The smaller outcrops of Cerro Aracamuni and Cerro Avispa, both reaching approximately 1600 m, lie to the north of this complex. The name Neblina Massif is sometimes applied specifically to Cerro de la Neblina, to the exclusion of Cerro Aracamuni and Cerro Avispa.

Four species are native to this area, all local endemics: H. ceracea, H. hispida, H. neblinae, and H. parva, though only the range of H. neblinae extends to the two northern cerro-plateaus. No Heliamphora are found on the small granitic outcrop of Cerro Aratitiyope (1700 m) to the north of the Neblina Massif.

Duida group
This area consists of the giant Cerro Duida as well as the much smaller Cerro Huachamacari to the northwest and Cerro Marahuaca to the northeast. Cerro Duida and Cerro Marahuaca share a common base and together form the Duida–Marahuaca Massif, while Cerro Huachamacari is derived from a separate base. The uneven plateau of Cerro Duida is heavily inclined, rising north to south from around 1300–1400 m to a maximum of 2358 m. But the highest point of the massif, at 2832 m, is found on Cerro Marahuaca, this being the second-highest mountain of the entire Guayana Shield (after Cerro de la Neblina). Cerro Marahuaca actually consists of two summit plateaus, the slightly larger northern one going by the Yekwana Amerindian name Fufha or Huha. The southern plateau is known by two local names; its northwestern edge is called Fuif (or Fhuif), whereas its southeastern portion is called Atahua'shiho (or Atawa Shisho). A massive ridge known as Cerro Petaca rises to at least 2700 m just west of these two plateaus. The third major tepui of the Duida group, Cerro Huachamacari, is comparatively low, reaching only 1900 m.

Two species are recognised from this complex and found nowhere else: H. macdonaldae and H. tatei. A third described species, H. tyleri, is universally treated as a synonym of H. tatei.

Eastern range
The eastern range of the genus includes the vast majority of species. It is largely encompassed by Bolívar state, Venezuela, but also extends into portions of western Guyana and northern Brazil.

Angasima and Upuigma
The imposing peaks of Angasima Tepui (2250 m) and Upuigma Tepui (2100 m) lie south of the much larger Chimantá Massif, from which they are separated by the Río Aparurén valley. Three Heliamphora species are native to Angasima Tepui: the undescribed endemic H. sp. 'Angasima Tepui' and two species shared with the nearby Chimantá Massif (H. huberi and H. pulchella). Only the range of H. pulchella extends to the isolated peak of Upuigma Tepui.

Aprada Massif
The Aprada Massif consists of Aprada Tepui (2500 m) and the smaller Araopán Tepui (2450 m) to the east. A steep, semi-circular ridge connects these two summits. The Aprada Massif lies northwest of the much larger Chimantá Massif, with which it shares its two native species: H. exappendiculata and H. pulchella.

Auyán Massif
The Auyán Massif is dominated by Auyán Tepui, a vast U-shaped plateau incised from the north by a deep central valley. It rises from 1600 m in the northwest to 2450 m in the southeast, where the world's highest uninterrupted waterfall, Angel Falls, is located. While Auyán Tepui is one of the largest tepuis, it hosts only a single Heliamphora species, H. minor, of which two varieties are recognised. Both varieties are present on Auyán Tepui itself and on the comparatively tiny Cerro La Luna (1650 m), located off its northern flank. Neither has been recorded from nearby Cerro El Sol (1750 m), otherwise known as Wei or Uei Tepui. The southernmost component of the Auyán Massif is the 1950 m high Uaipán Tepui or Waipán Tepui, which likewise has no recorded Heliamphora.

Chimantá Massif
The Chimantá Massif is a huge, highly fragmented complex with a total summit area of 615 square kilometres. It is dissected across the middle by the Río Tírica. The massif is notable for its species richness (among the greatest in the region), for its varied habitat types, and for its elevation, reaching 2698 m on its highest peak, Murey Tepui (Eruoda Tepui). Murey Tepui is joined in the northern portion by Abacapá Tepui, Agparamán Tepui, Apacará Tepui, Chimantá Tepui, Tirepón Tepui, and Toronó Tepui (an additional summit, Sarvén Tepui, may also be distinguished around ). The smaller southern portion comprises Akopán Tepui, Amurí Tepui, and Churí Tepui.

The Chimantá Massif is home to five described species (H. chimantensis, H. exappendiculata, H. huberi, H. pulchella, and H. uncinata) and one undescribed species (H. sp. 'Akopán Tepui'). Many of its species are spread across several adjacent tepuis due to their close geographical proximity.

Eastern Tepuis
The Eastern Tepuis chain, or Roraima–Ilú range, stretches in a northwesterly direction from the tripoint of Brazil, Guyana, and Venezuela, closely following the Guyana–Venezuela border, with an isolated double-peaked plateau (Serra do Sol or Uei Tepui) to the south. Moving in a northwesterly direction from Serra do Sol (2150 m), the major summits of this chain are Mount Roraima (2810 m), Kukenán Tepui (2650 m), Yuruaní Tepui (2400 m), Wadakapiapué Tepui (2000 m), Karaurín Tepui (2500 m), Ilú Tepui (2700 m), and Tramen Tepui. With the exception of the tiny Wadakapiapué Tepui, all of these peaks are known to support Heliamphora. The Eastern Tepuis chain includes some of the most widely visited tepuis, particularly Roraima and nearby Kukenán. The Ilú (Uru) and Tramen Tepuis are treated here as a single locality since they are joined by a common base and share the same assemblage of Heliamphora taxa.

Five closely allied species are recognised from this region—H. arenicola, H. elongata, H. glabra, H. ionasi, and H. nutans—all of which are endemic.

Los Testigos
Los Testigos, or the Aparamán range, is a chain of four rather small and floristically similar tepuis forming a bridge between Auyán Tepui in the west and Ptari Tepui in the east. From west to east the four major peaks are: Aparamán Tepui (2100 m), Murisipán Tepui (2350 m), Tereke-yurén Tepui (1900 m), and Kamarkawarai Tepui (2400 m), the latter three sharing a common slope area. There however remains some confusion in the literature regarding the names of these peaks.

Two closely related species are recognised from Los Testigos—H. collina and H. folliculata—both of which are endemic or almost so (see Ptari Tepui).

In line with and to the west of the Los Testigos chain lies the Los Hermanos massif, which consists of two upland peaks: Amaruay Tepui and Padapué Tepui. No Heliamphora have been recorded from this group.

Ptari Tepui
Ptari Tepui (2400 m) is a relatively isolated tepui to the east of the Los Testigos chain. It forms part of the Ptari Massif, which also includes the 2200 m high Carrao Tepui (Karrao Tepui) to the northeast and the 10 km long ridge known as Sororopán Tepui (2050 m) to the southeast. Of the three, only Ptari Tepui has an open, rocky summit mostly free of vegetation cover, and only this peak is known to host Heliamphora.

Two species are known with certainty from Ptari Tepui (H. purpurascens and H. sarracenioides, both endemic) and a further two (H. collina and H. heterodoxa) may also be present.

Uplands
The uplands of the Venezuelan Guayana are regarded as those areas with an elevation of approximately 500–1500 m, with higher elevations being highland and lower ones lowland.

The Gran Sabana (literally "Great Savannah") is a vast area of tropical uplands covering nearly 30,000 km2, which surrounds many of the tepuis of the eastern range. It gradually rises in elevation from 750 m in the south to 1450 m in the north. The rocky uplands of Sierra de Lema and Sierra Senkopirén lie to the north and northwest of the Gran Sabana and surround the Auyán Massif. They have an elevational range of around 700 to 1650 m. Cerro Venamo is a sandstone mountain near the border between Venezuela and Guyana, at the northeastern tip of the Gran Sabana. With a height of 1600 m it falls somewhere between an upland and a true highland area. As with many other localities in the Guayana Highlands, the name Cerro Venamo has been inconsistently applied to a number of adjacent areas.

Heliamphora ciliata is endemic to these upland areas and H. heterodoxa may also be (though see Ptari Tepui).

Notes

a.The altitudinal distribution of H. ceracea is not specified in Sarraceniaceae of South America, either in the species profile or the formal description, but the holotype was collected at an elevation of 1900 m.

This is now recognised by the Brazilian Institute of Geography and Statistics (IBGE), the federal government's official geographic survey and census agency, which jointly organised the expedition.

c.There is some discrepancy between published sources with respect to the distribution of H. minor var. pilosa: the formal description of Fleischmann & Grande Allende (2012) states that this variety is endemic to the northern portion of the summit plateau of Auyán Tepui, while in Sarraceniaceae of South America (co-authored by Fleischmann) its range is said to encompass both Auyán Tepui and Cerro La Luna, with photographs from both localities included.

d.The maps provided in Sarraceniaceae of South America place Maringma Tepui on the Brazil–Venezuela border some distance southeast of Mount Roraima, but other published sources place it just inside Guyana near the border with Brazil, around 17 km east of Mount Roraima. In Sarraceniaceae of South America it is stated that Maringma Tepui was previously incorrectly called "Mount Yakontipu" by Fleischmann et al. (2007) in their description of Drosera solaris.

e.Otto Huber summarised this muddled toponymy as follows: "There is, however, confusion concerning the precise names of the two central mountains; according to Brewer-Carías (1978), Murochiopán-tepui is the name of a smaller lateral mountain of Aparamán [], followed to the east by the high Tereke Yurén-tepui and the lower Tucuy-wo-cuyén-tepui, whereas members of the Terramar Foundation expeditions (Steyermark 1986a; Holst 1987; George 1988) apply the name Murisipán-tepui to Brewer's Tereke Yurén-tepui, and the name Tereke-yurén-tepui to Brewer's Tucuy-wo-cuyén-tepui, omitting the name of the smaller lateral mountain of Aparamán-tepui." A yet different sequence (and spelling) of names can be found in, for example, the formal description of H. folliculata, namely: Murosipan, Aparaman, Tereke-Yuren, and Kamarkaiwaran.

f.The locality commonly known today as Cerro Venamo, which forms part of the international boundary between Guyana and Venezuela, does not correspond to the mountain originally given this name by Julian Alfred Steyermark. The latter is known to host Heliamphora while the former is not.

g.This assumes that the high slope- and summit-growing H. sp. 'Akopán Tepui' and H. sp. 'Angasima Tepui' are not conspecific with H. heterodoxa.

References

.
Heliamphora.
Heliamphora.
Guayana Highlands
Heliamphora
Heliamphora distribution